These hits topped the Dutch Top 40 in 1998 (see 1998 in music).

See also
1998 in music

1998 in the Netherlands
1998 record charts
1998